Lime Street in Liverpool, England, was created as a street in 1790. Its most famous feature is Lime Street railway station. It is part of the William Brown Street conservation area.

History
The street was named for lime kilns owned by William Harvey, a local businessman. When the street was laid out in 1790 it was outside the city limits, but by 1804 the lime kilns were causing problems at a nearby infirmary. The doctors complained about the smell, and so the kilns were moved away, but the street name remained unchanged.

With the arrival of the railway line in 1836, the street moved from a marginal to a central location in the city, a position that confirmed by the creation of St George's Hall, on the side of the street opposite the railway station, in 1854. Wellington's Column, a monument to the Duke of Wellington was built to mark one end of the street, at the corner with William Brown Street.

The modern street is part of the A5038 road. The Lime Street name ends at the crossroads marked by the Adelphi Hotel, though, as Renshaw Street, the road continues directly uphill to St Luke's Church.

The Futurist Cinema operated on Lime Street from 1912, until the cinema's closure in 1982. The building was demolished in 2016.

The Empire Theatre opened on Lime Street in 1925, and was the second theatre to be built on the site. The first theatre had opened in 1866, and was demolished in 1924. The theatre has the largest two-tier auditorium in Britain.

Reference to the street
The street is mentioned as the favourite haunt of prostitute "Maggie May" in the Liverpool folk song of that name, most famously recorded by the Beatles on the album Let It Be.

The name has been used in many novels and plays, including Alun Owen's No Trams to Lime Street and Helen Forrester's autobiographical Lime Street at Two.

In 2012 the farce A Nightmare on Lime Street was performed at the Royal Court Theatre, Liverpool, starring David Gest as Frankenstein's monster, being recreated in the bowels of Lime Street railway station.

Gallery

References 

Streets in Liverpool